The Cloverly Formation is a geological formation of Early and Late Cretaceous age (Valanginian to Cenomanian stage) that is present in parts of Montana, Wyoming, Colorado and Utah in the western United States. It was named for a post office on the eastern side of the Bighorn Basin in Wyoming by N.H. Darton in 1904. The sedimentary rocks of formation were deposited in floodplain environments and contain vertebrate fossils, including a diverse assemblage of dinosaur remains. In 1973, the Cloverly Formation Site was designated as a National Natural Landmark by the National Park Service.

Stratigraphy
The Cloverly Formation rests disconformably on the Morrison Formation and is conformably overlain by the Thermopolis Shale. It is subdivided into a variety of members, depending on the location. In the Bighorn Basin along the Montana-Wyoming border, Moberly (1960) divided the Cloverly into the following three members:
The Pryor Conglomerate lies at the base and contains abundant black chert. It is named from thick beds exposed on the west side of the Pryor Mountains.
The Little Sheep Member lies in the middle and is composed of pale-purple, gray to almost white, bentonitic mudstone.
The uppermost unit is the Himes Member, which contains some coarse-grained channel sandstone deposits, but consists primarily of brightly multicolored (variegated) mudstones.

In contrast, Ostrom (1970) divided the formation into four units, which he named Units IV-VII:

 Unit IV equates to the Pryor Conglomerate of Moberly and consists of a conglomerate or conglomeratic sandstone.
 Unit V, overlaying Unit IV, consists of a lower grey-to-purple claystone with abundant fist-sized chalcedony and barite concretions; the unit is highly bentonitic and contains occasional channel sands.
 Unit VI is a discontinuous "salt and pepper" cross-stratified channel sandstone with occasional conglomerate, considered by Moberly to be part of the Himes Member.
 Unit VII, the uppermost, is a maroon to orange claystone with occasional highly rounded and polished pebbles of silica.

Age
A stratigraphic revision of the Cloverly Formation using new uranium lead dates reinterpret the formation as spanning the Valanginian-Cenomanian stages of the Cretaceous period. The individual ages of the members are listed below:

 Pryor Conglomerate; 140-130 Ma (Valanginian-Hauterivian)
 Little Sheep Member; 130-124 Ma (marine section) (Hauterivian-Barremian) and 124-109 Ma (terrestrial section) (Barremian-Albian)
 Himes Member; 109-98 Ma (Albian-Cenomanian)

Depositional environment 
The sediments of the Cloverly Formation were deposited in alluvial and floodplain environments. The basal conglomerates probably represent braided river deposits, while the sandstones were deposited in fluvial channels. The mudstones that contain most of the fossils represent overbank, lacustrine, and pedogenic deposits.

Vertebrate fauna 
Animals recovered include the dinosaurs Deinonychus, Microvenator, Tenontosaurus, Zephyrosaurus and Sauropelta as well as fragmentary remains of Titanosaurs, Ankylosaurs and Ornithomimids.  As well, two genera of turtle
Naomichelys and Glyptops and the lungfish Ceratodus.

Dinosaur eggs have been found in Montana.

References for data: Ostrom 1970; Cifelli et al. 1998; Cifelli 1999; Nydam and Cifelli 2002. Possible goniopholidid remains are known from the formation.

Ornithischians

Saurischians
Theropod eggshell fragments are known from the formation. Unidentifiable ornithomimid remains are present and most commonly represented by toe bones. Indeterminate allosauroid remains are known from the formation. Remains identified by John Ostrom as Ornithomimus are suspected by Jack Horner to be of a new ornithomimid genus. Possible remains of a microraptorian, a troodontid, and a basal tyrannosauroid similar to Moros have also been found here as well.

Mammals

Turtles

Bony fish
Indeterminate amiiformes are known from the formation.

See also

 List of dinosaur-bearing rock formations
 Cloverly Fauna

Footnotes

References

 Burton, D., Greenhalgh, B.W., Britt, B.B., Kowallis, B.J., Elliott, W.S., and Barrick, R. 2006. New radiometric ages from the Cedar Mountain Formation, Utah and the Cloverly Formation, Wyoming: implications for contained dinosaur faunas. Geological Society of America Abstracts with Programs 38(7): 52.
 Chen, Z.-Q. and Lubin, S. 1997. A fission track study of the terrigenous sedimentary sequences of the Morrison and Cloverly Formations in northeastern Bighorn Basin, Wyoming. The Mountain Geologist 34:51-62.
 Cifelli, R.L. 1999. Tribosphenic mammal from the North American Early Cretaceous. Nature 401:363-366.
 Cifelli, R.L., Wible, J.R., and Jenkins, F.A. 1998. Triconodont mammals from the Cloverly Formation (Lower Cretaceous), Montana and Wyoming. Journal of Vertebrate Paleontology 18: 237-241.
 Horner, John R. Dinosaurs Under the Big Sky (Cloverly Formation). Mountain Press Publishing Company. pp. 93–100. .
 Nydam, R.L., and Cifelli, R.L. 2002. Lizards from the Lower Cretaceous (Aptian-Albian) Antlers and Cloverly Formations. Journal of Vertebrate Paleontology 22: 286-298.
 Ostrom, J. H. 1970. Stratigraphy and paleontology of the Cloverly Formation (Lower Cretaceous) of the Bighorn Basin area, Wyoming and Montana. Peabody Museum Bulletin 35:1-234
 Varricchio, D. J. 2001. Late Cretaceous oviraptorosaur (Theropoda) dinosaurs from Montana. pp. 42–57 in D. H. Tanke and K. Carpenter (eds.), Mesozoic Vertebrate Life. Indiana University Press, Indianapolis, Indiana. 
 Weishampel, David B.; Dodson, Peter; and Osmólska, Halszka (eds.): The Dinosauria, 2nd, Berkeley: University of California Press. 861 pp. .

 
Geologic formations of Colorado
Geologic formations of Montana
Geologic formations of Wyoming
Geologic formations of Utah
Lower Cretaceous Series of North America
Cretaceous Colorado
Cretaceous Montana
Cretaceous geology of Wyoming
Cretaceous geology of Utah
Aptian Stage
Albian Stage
Mudstone formations
Conglomerate formations
Sandstone formations of the United States
Fluvial deposits
Lacustrine deposits
Fossiliferous stratigraphic units of North America
Paleontology in Montana
Paleontology in Wyoming
Geology of the Rocky Mountains
National Natural Landmarks in Montana